Karl Penka (26 October 1847, Mohelnice – 10 February 1912, Vienna) was an Austrian philologist and anthropologist. Known for his now-outdated theories locating the Proto-Indo-European homeland in Northern Europe, Penka has been described as "a transitional figure between Aryanism and Nordicism".

Biography 
Born in Müglitz, Moravia (now Mohelnice, Czech Republic), Penka was between 1873 and 1906 a master at the Maximiliansgymnasium, a high school for boys, in Vienna.

He studied anthropology from the point of view of comparative linguistics and took a particular interest in the origins of the Indo-Europeans. He used the term Aryan in the linguistic sense, and extended it into a broad term of race and culture. Penka popularised the theory that the Aryan race had emerged in Scandinavia and could be identified by the Nordic characteristics of blue eyes and blond hair. In his 1883 book Origines Ariacae ('Origins of the Aryans'), he proposed that the Indo-European homeland was situated in the far north, corresponding to the Hyperborea of antiquity. 
 
Penka died in Vienna in 1912. He is now seen as a pioneer of racist and anti-Semitic theories in ethnology.

Selected works
Die Nominalflexion der indogermanischen Sprachen (Vienna, 1878)
Origines Ariacae. Linguistisch-ethnologische Untersuchungen zur ältesten Geschichte der arischen Völker und Sprachen (Vienna, 1883)
Die Herkunft der Arier. Neue Beiträge zur historischen Anthropologie der europäischen Völker (Vienna, 1886)
'Entstehung der arischen Rasse' in Das Ausland (1891), from p. 132
Neue Hypothesen über die Urheimat der Arier (Leipzig, 1906)
O. Schraders Hypothese von der südrussischen Urheimat der Indogermanen (Leipzig, 1908, in series Beiträge zur Rassenkunde, 6)

Further reading
Lars von Karstedt, Sprache und Kultur. Eine Geschichte der deutschsprachigen Ethnolinguistik (Diss, Hamburg 2004)
Z. Filip, Biografický slovník okresu Šumperk (Šumperk, 2001)
Kurt Riedel, Die rassenkundliche Begründung des Begriffs "nordisch" durch den Wiener Professor Karl Penka (Dresden, 1940)

References

1847 births
1912 deaths
People from Mohelnice
People from the Margraviate of Moravia
Moravian-German people
Anthropological linguists
German anthropologists
Germanic studies scholars
Indo-Europeanists